The Research Institute for Nuclear Problems of Belarusian State University (INP BSU) is a research institute in Minsk, Belarus. Its main fields of research are nuclear physics, particle physics, materials science and nanotechnology.

Foundation 
Research Institute for Nuclear Problems of Belarusian State University was founded on September 1, 1986 by a decree of the USSR government.

First General Director, now Honorary Director: Vladimir G. Baryshevsky, Doctor of Sciences (Phys-Math), Professor, Honored Scientist of the Republic of Belarus, winner of the State Prize of the Republic of Belarus in the field of science and technology, was awarded the Skarina Order and the Honor Order, co-author of two registered discoveries of the USSR in nuclear physics (N 224 (1979) and N 360 (1981)).

Prof. Sergei A. Maksimenko was appointed the INP General Director since January 2013.

Major research areas
 nuclear and elementary-particle physics, cosmo-particle physics and nuclear astrophysics; 	
 extreme states of matter under ultrahigh temperatures and pressures, and magnetic cumulation of energy;
 novel composite, nano- and microstructured materials;
 radio- and nuclear technologies based on radioactive sources, accelerators, and nuclear reactors;
 novel methods for ionizing radiation measurements.

Most important achievements 
Parametric x-ray radiation (PXR), a new type of radiation generated by charged particle passing through crystals, was predicted theoretically and observed experimentally for the first time.
PXR, generated by high-energy protons in crystals, was detected on the particle accelerator at the Institute for High Energy Physics (Protvino, Russia), and  the multiwave regime of PXR generation from electrons was observed on the SIRIUS accelerator (Tomsk, Russia).
A new type of radiation produced by relativistic charged particles (electrons, positrons) channeled through crystals was predicted. This phenomenon was observed in many physics research centers worldwide.
Oscillation of 3-γ decay annihilation plane of ortho-positronium in a magnetic field was predicted theoretically and observed experimentally (in collaboration with the Institute of Physics of the National Academy of Sciences of Belarus).
The earlier unknown characteristic of a muonium atom – quadrupole moment in the ground state – was predicted and was observed in experiments.
The existence of spin oscillations and spin dichroism, and hence the appearance of tensor polarization of deuterons (and other high-energy particles) moving in unpolarized matter were hypothesized; spin dichroism phenomenon was observed in joint experiments performed in Germany and Russia (Joint Institute for Nuclear Research).
The phenomenon of spin rotation of high-energy particles in bent crystals was predicted. This phenomenon was experimentally observed in Fermilab.
Synchrotron-type electron-positron pair production in crystals was predicted and observed at CERN.
The phenomenon of dichroism and birefringence of high-energy γ-quanta in crystals was predicted.
The effect of radiative cooling of high-energy electrons in crystals was predicted and observed at CERN.
A new class of generators of electromagnetic radiation – the volume free electron laser – was developed.
The effect of multiple volume reflection of high-energy particles from different planes inside one bent crystal was predicted. This effect was observed in CERN.
The existence of time-reversal non-invariant phenomena of light polarization plane rotation and birefringence in matter placed in a magnetic field and CP-non-invariant (T-non-invariant) effects of appearance of the induced electric dipole moment in atoms and nuclei placed in a magnetic field was theoretically justified.
Explosive flux compression generators of high voltage and high current were developed - thus pioneering the frontier research in this field in Belarus.
New constraints imposed on the existence and the size of extra-dimensions of space were found based on the study of the absorption of relativistic plasma, which filled the Universe in the early stages of evolution, by primordial black holes.
A theory of scattering of electromagnetic radiation by an isolated finite-length carbon nanotube (CNT) was developed. This enabled both qualitative and quantitative interpretation of the absorption peak in the Terahertz range, which can be experimentally observed in CNT-containing composite materials.
The existence of a localized plasmon resonance in composite materials with single-walled carbon nanotubes was confirmed experimentally. This effect finds applications in the design of novel electromagnetic shielding materials and in medicine.
Lead tungstate scintillation material, PbWO4 (PWO), was developed, which is the most popular scintillation material in high energy physics through its application for electromagnetic calorimeters at LHC experiments, namely CMS and ALICE and by PANDA Collaboration (Germany) INP is a part of the CMS experimental team at the Large Hadron Collider, which along with the ATLAS team announced in 2012 the formal discovery of the Higgs boson in Physics Letters B(716/1).
Microwave power engineering: development of new applications of microwave radiation for industry, agriculture, and environmental protection.

Scientific schools
A renowned scientific school on nuclear optics of polarized media, founded by Prof. V.G. Baryshevsky, has been actively engaged in research into nuclear and elementary-particle physics.

Nanoelectromagnetism is a new research area exploring the effects caused by the interaction of electromagnetic (or other) radiation with nanosized objects and nanostructured systems. A scientific school on nanoelectromagnetism is currently being developed (headed by Prof.S.A. Maksimenko and Prof. G.Ya. Slepyan).

References

External links

 Belarusian State University — Official website Belarusian State University
 Research Institute for Nuclear Problems of Belarusian State University — Official website

Research institutes in Belarus
Research institutes in the Soviet Union
1986 establishments in the Soviet Union
Research institutes established in 1986